The 17th Austin Film Critics Association Awards, honoring the best in filmmaking for 2021, were announced on January 11, 2022. The nominations were announced on January 4, 2022.

The Power of the Dog led the nominations with nine and also received the most awards with five wins, including Best Film.

Winners and nominees
The winners are listed first and in bold.

Top 10 Films
 Pig
 The Power of the Dog
 Licorice Pizza
 Dune
 Drive My Car
 The Green Knight
 Titane
 The Tragedy of Macbeth
 Parallel Mothers / The Worst Person in the World (TIE)

References

External links
 Official website

2021 in Texas
2021 film awards
2021